Yankee is a term for various groups of Americans.

Yankee may also refer to:

Sports

Teams
 New York Yankees, an American Major League Baseball team
 Auburn Yankees, two minor league baseball teams based in Auburn, New York, one in 1889, and another affiliated with the New York Yankees from 1958 to 1961
 Battle Creek Yankees, an affiliate in 2004 and 2005
 Boise Yankees, an affiliate in 1952 and 1953 
 Dominican Summer League Yankees 1
 Dominican Summer League Yankees 2
 Fort Lauderdale Yankees, a Class A Florida State League affiliate (1962–1992)
 Gulf Coast Yankees, a Rookie League affiliate
 Kearney Yankees, an affiliate from 1956 to 1959
 Manchester Yankees, two affiliates: in the Class B New England League (1948–1949) and in the Double-A Eastern League (1969–1971)
 Paintsville Yankees, a former minor league affiliate
 Scranton/Wilkes-Barre Yankees, a Triple-A Minor League affiliate
 Staten Island Yankees, a Low-A Minor League affiliate
 Tampa Yankees, a High-A Minor League affiliate
 Trenton Thunder, a Double-A Minor League affiliate
 Ventura Yankees, an affiliate from 1947 to 1949
 West Haven Yankees, a Double-A Eastern League baseball team affiliated with the New York Yankees (1972–1979) and the Oakland A's (1980–1982)
 New York Yankees (disambiguation), various defunct American teams
 United States Men's National Soccer Team, sometimes referred to as the "Yankees"
 Augusta Yankees, a South Atlantic League minor league baseball team based in Augusta, Georgia, from 1962 to 1963
 Bronx Yankees, an American Basketball League team in the 1938-39 season

Conferences
 Yankee Conference (1946–1997), a former collegiate sports conference in the eastern United States
 Yankee Small College Conference, a northern New England Division II athletic conference

Other
 Yankee Handicap, an American Thoroughbred horse race from 1935 to 1987

In the military
 Yankee-class submarine, NATO reporting name for several types of Soviet nuclear submarines
 USS Yankee (1861), a sidewheel steamer
 USS Yankee (1892), a steam ship used in the Spanish–American War
 The 'Y' version of the Aeritalia G.91 fighter aircraft

Transportation
 American Aviation AA-1 Yankee, a light aircraft
 Yankee (ferry), an historic ferry homeported in New York
 Brigantine Yankee, a steel-hulled schooner which went aground in 1964
 Yankee (motorcycle), an American-made motorcycle
 Yankee (yacht), J-class yacht involved in the America's Cup

Businesses
 Yankee Candle, an American manufacturer of scented candles
 Yankee Group, an American information technology and market research advisory firm
 Yankee Stores, a defunct American retail chain

Arts and entertainment
 Yankee (film), a 1966 Italian film
 Yankee (album) (2014), by Japanese musician Kenshi Yonezu
 Yankee (TV series), a 2019 Mexican TV series
 Yankees (album) (1983),  improvised music by Derek Bailey, John Zorn and George Lewis
 Yankee (magazine), a New Hampshire periodical
 The Yankee, an American literary magazine published 1828–1829

Other uses
 The letter Y in the NATO phonetic alphabet
 Daddy Yankee (born 1977), Puerto Rican singer
 Yankee Sullivan (1811–1856), bare-knuckle fighter and boxer
 A type of bet offered by UK bookmakers
 Yankee Harbour, Greenwich Island, Antarctica
 Yankee Lake (New York), a lake in Sullivan County, New York
 , a Japanese term for a juvenile delinquent

See also 
 Billy Yank, a reference to a Union supporter during the American Civil War
 Swamp Yankee, a rural New Englander
 Damn Yankees (disambiguation)
 All pages beginning with Yankee
 
 Yanki (disambiguation)
 Yanqi (disambiguation)